Studia Philosophica Estonica is an Estonian peer-reviewed journal published by University of Tartu Press. The journal is compiled by the Department of Philosophy of Tartu University. It publishes scholarly articles in English, German, and Estonian. Studia Philosophica Estonica is indexed by EBSCO, ERIH PLUS, and DOAJ. The first volume was published in 1893. The magazine has also been published in online form since 2008.

History 

The journal's origins date back to 1893, when the proceedings of the University of Tartu began being published under the name Acta et Commentationes Universitatis Tartuensis. During the Soviet era, philosophical collections were published as a separate section of university proceedings, which were renamed in 1993 Studia Philosophica. The journal was first published in its current online form in 2008, but in 2011 two special issues were also published on paper. The journal is divided into volumes containing articles published during one year. As of 2009, the first issue of each volume covers the usual subjects, and later issues are special issues.

Editing 
The editor-in-chief of the magazine is Roomet Jakapi. The editor of theoretical philosophy is Daniel Cohnitz, the editor of the history of philosophy is Eduard Parhomenko, the editor of practical philosophy is Kadri Simm, and the managing editor is Mats Volberg. In addition, Edit Talpsepp-Randla is an editor.

The journal is guided by an open access policy, which provides free access to all content.

References

External links

Academic journals of Estonia
Philosophy journals